Singrauli railway station is an important railway station in Singrauli district, Madhya Pradesh. Its code is SGRL. It serves Singrauli city. The station consists of 3 platforms. The platform is not well sheltered. Singrauli Station serves as a major transport point for the nearby areas. It lacks many facilities including water and sanitation. The station has been recently extended to 3 platform with coalyard being shifted few hundred meters away from station. Station has been primarily used by Indian Railways for transportation of coal being excavated from nearby mines. The station falls under the Dhanbad Region of Indian Railways and is the only station in Madhya Pradesh under Dhanbad Region.

Major trains 

Some of the important trains that run from Singrauli are:

 Singrauli–Patna Link Express
 Singrauli–Varanasi Intercity Express
 Singrauli–Tanankpur (via Allahabad, Lucknow, Bareily) Triveni Express
 Singrauli–Jabalpur Intercity Express
 Singrauli–Bhopal Superfast Express
 Singrauli–Hazrat Nizamuddin Superfast Express
 Ajmer–Sealdah Express
 Ajmer–Santragachi Weekly Express
 Ahmedabad Kolkata Express
 Shaktipunj Express
 Chopan–Katni Passenger 
 Katni–Chopan Fast Passenger 
 Katni–Chopan Mix Passenger

See also

References

Singrauli
Dhanbad railway division
Railway stations in Madhya Pradesh